Vénus was a 38-gun  of the French Navy.

In the summer of 1782, Vénus operated as a transport between Rochefort and Île de Ré. She served in Martinique during the American War of Independence.

From 1785 to 1788, Vénus undertook a scientific expedition in the Indian Ocean, under Captain de Rossily.

Vénus was wrecked in a storm on her way back to France, on 31 December 1788

References

Age of Sail frigates of France
Hébé-class frigates
1782 ships
Ships built in France
Maritime incidents in 1788